Radomlje is a settlement on the left bank of the Kamnik Bistrica River north of Domžale in the Upper Carniola region of Slovenia.

Church

The local church is dedicated to Saint Margaret and was first mentioned in documents dating to 1391.

References

External links

Radomlje on Geopedia

Populated places in the Municipality of Domžale